The 1945 Pacific typhoon season was the first official season to be included in the West Pacific typhoon database. It has no official bounds; it ran year-round in 1945, but most tropical cyclones tend to form in the northwestern Pacific Ocean between June and December. These dates conventionally delimit the period of each year when most tropical cyclones form in the northwestern Pacific Ocean.

The scope of this article is limited to the Pacific Ocean, north of the equator and west of the international date line. Storms that form east of the date line and north of the equator are called hurricanes; see 1945 Pacific hurricane season. Predecessor agency to the Joint Typhoon Warning Center (JTWC), Fleet Weather Center/Typhoon Tracking Center was established on the island of Guam in June 1945, after multiple typhoons, including Typhoon Cobra in the previous season and Typhoon Connie in this season, had caused a significant loss of men and ships. It would not take major responsibility in the West Pacific basin until 1950 season. Instead, storms in this season are identified and named by the United States Armed Services, and these names are taken from the list that USAS publicly adopted before this season had started earlier this year. Since this is the first season to be included in the West Pacific typhoon database, this would also be the first season where the names of Western Pacific tropical cyclones are preserved publicly.

Systems

Tropical Storm Ann

The first named storm of the season, Tropical Storm Ann formed on April 19 at relatively low latitude. The storm didn't affect any landmasses and dissipated on April 26.

Tropical Storm Betty

The second named storm of the season, Tropical Storm Betty formed on May 13, 1945, and began to move in a northeastern direction. It strengthened into a tropical storm only 18 hours later and continued on its path. However, the storm eventually moved further north, and into colder waters. Betty weakened into a tropical depression and dissipated on May 16th, having not threatened land at all.

Typhoon Connie

A small yet powerful typhoon, Connie was first spotted on June 1 by the Fleet Weather Center on Guam, moving northeast. Winds were reported to have been as high as 140 mph. But by June 7, it began to weaken. Its final fate is unknown.

The U.S. Navy's Third Fleet was hit by Connie, and reporting about the storm frequently refers to it as Typhoon Viper.  The same fleet had previously been hit, with great loss of life, by Cobra the previous year.  Connie being lesser, only one officer and five seamen were lost or killed because of Connie, and around 150 airplanes on its carriers were either lost or damaged.

Tropical Storm Doris

Tropical Storm Doris existed from June 18 to June 21 and did not make landfall.

Tropical Storm Nancy

Tropical Storm Nancy formed on July 3 to the east of Vietnam. It started to move in a northeast direction before shifting its course to the northwest until it eventually made landfall near Hong Kong as a tropical storm. It rapidly weakened over land and dissipated on June 8. The damage is unknown.

Typhoon Opal

Tropical Storm Peggy

Tropical Storm Edna

Typhoon Eva

Typhoon Queenie

Tropical Storm Frances

Tropical Storm Grace

Typhoon Ruth

Typhoon Susan

Typhoon Tess

Typhoon Helen

Typhoon Helen formed on August 29. It moved west-northwest and strengthened into a category 3 typhoon with 120 mph winds. It weakened slightly to a category two and struck Taiwan. It briefly was over waters before it hit Mainland China as a tropical storm. It rapidly weakened and dissipated on September 4.

Typhoon Ursula
This typhoon is especially remembered for the 6 aircraft containing liberated prisoners of war brought down by the typhoon between Okinawa and Manila. Over 120 servicemen lost their lives. At the time, it was the single greatest loss of life in an aviation disaster during peacetime.

Typhoon Ida

In Japan, Typhoon Ida is called Makurazaki Typhoon. More than 2,000 people were killed in the Hiroshima Prefecture after heavy rains brought by a weakening Ida caused severe landslides.

Tropical Storm Verna

Tropical Storm Wanda

Typhoon Jean

Tropical Storm Kate

Typhoon Louise

Louise was first seen developing on October 2, 1945, in the Caroline Islands. It unexpectedly veered north and slowed down, only to intensify as it passed over Okinawa on October 9 with 90 mph wind gusts and a minimum central pressure of 968.5 mbar. Shortly after, Louise began to weaken, and hit Japan as a strong tropical storm. The tropical cyclone became extratropical shortly after on October 12. In Okinawa, 36 people  died, 47 people were reported missing, and 100 people were seriously injured. 

In Buckner Bay, where the US military were occupying a temporary base,  to  waves were reported to have crashed ashore, tearing into Quonset huts and other buildings. At the time, Buckner Bay was being used as a port by the US military. Fifteen merchant ships were driven ashore, with a few wrecked. Three US Navy destroyers were grounded and declared beyond salvage. Over 200 other US military vessels, including six LSTs, a number of special purpose  boats, patrol boats, and amphibious landing craft were grounded, severely damaged, or wrecked beyond repair. Eighty percent of the buildings in the bay were completely wiped out, while all 60 airplanes at the local airports were damaged.

Tropical Storm Marge

A tropical storm was tracked on November 1 to the northwest of the Marianas. It moved to the west, before making landfall on Tayabas (now Quezon) in the Philippines. It was last noted on November 4 over Aurora. The damage is unknown.

Tropical Storm Yvonne

Typhoon Nora

Typhoon Nora formed on November 22nd, 1945, and began to move towards the Philippines. It became a typhoon and a category 1 equivalent storm on the SSHWS scale. The slow-moving storm moved towards the Philippines, but it turned northeast at the last moment, moving over colder waters and dissipating.

Storm names

See also

1945 Atlantic hurricane season
List of Pacific typhoon seasons
 1900–1950 South-West Indian Ocean cyclone seasons
 1940s Australian region cyclone seasons
 1940s South Pacific cyclone seasons

References

Bibliography

External links
 
Information on Typhoon of June 1945
Information on Typhoon of October 1945 (archive link)
 Unisys Tropical Cyclone Data for 1945

1945
1945 natural disasters
1945 meteorology
1945 in Asia
1945 in Oceania